Tossal dels Tres Reis or Tossal del Rei ('Peak of the King') is a mountain of the Ports de Tortosa-Beseit massif, Spain. It has an elevation of 1,350 metres above sea level.

This mountain is one of the Emblematic Summits of Catalonia.

Description
Its name means 'Peak of the Three Kings' and it is located where the borders of the ancient Kingdoms of Aragon, Valencia and Principality of Catalonia meet.

An ancient legend has it that in the days of the Moors and Christians, three monarchs - two infidels and one who feared Christ - used to meet on top of a mountain from which they could see their territories. On the summit, there is a cairn marking the place where these three kings met.

See also
Rock of the Three Kingdoms
Iberian System
List of mountains in Aragon
Mountains of Catalonia
Mountains of the Valencian Community
Tinença de Benifassà
Tripoint

References

External links 
 Web turística de la Tinença de Benifassà
 Parc Natural de la Tinença de Benifassà - Tourist Brochure

Baix Maestrat
Ports de Tortosa-Beseit
Mountains of Catalonia
One-thousanders of Spain
Emblematic summits of Catalonia